Eupithecia efferata is a moth in the family Geometridae. It is found in Pakistan.

The wingspan is about 17.5–19 mm. The forewings are pale grey and the hindwings are whitish grey.

References

Moths described in 2008
efferata
Moths of Asia